Sally-Anne McCormack (born 12 March 1965) is an Australian clinical psychologist, former teacher and media commentator.

Education 
McCormack graduated from Monash University with a Masters in Psychology, as well as both ACU and Deakin University with teaching qualifications. She was endorsed as a Clinical Psychologist in March 2010.

Career 
McCormack filmed The Sally-Anne Show after creating TV pilots in both 2013 and 2014 for community television.  An article was written describing her varied career roles in The Sydney Morning Herald newspaper in 2015

McCormack is a consulting psychologist for Mother & Baby magazine. She is the founder of ANTSA Psychology ("Automatic Negative Thoughts - Strategies for All") and is the author of Stomp Out The ANTs - Automatic Negative Thoughts as well as Living With ANTs. In addition, she has created a poster titled "Which ANT Are You?" for children.

Family 
McCormack is a mother to four daughters; she lost a fifth daughter to Edwards syndrome in 1991.

Publications 

Stomp Out The ANTs - Automatic Negative Thoughts book
 Which ANT Are You? poster
Living With ANTs book

References

External links 
 Sally-Anne McCormack
Sally-Anne McCormack on ABC Life Matters Radio
 Sally-Anne McCormack speaking on ABC Drive Radio
 An early interview by Sally-Anne McCormack about CyberSafety
 Sally-Anne McCormack talking about Child & Adolescent issues
 Sally-Anne McCormack on Ninemsn.com.au advising on smoking triggers
 News.com.au article
 Sally-Anne McCormack on Channel 7's "The Daily Edition" TV show talking about addiction
 Sally-Anne McCormack on Channel 7's "The Daily Edition" talking about cheaters

Australian psychologists
Australian women psychologists
21st-century Australian women writers
21st-century Australian writers
1965 births
Living people